The Book of Psalms (  or  ; , , lit. The book is an anthology of individual Hebrew religious hymns, with 150 in the Jewish and Western Christian tradition and more in the Eastern Christian churches. Many are linked to the name of David, but modern mainstream scholarship rejects his authorship, instead attributing the composition of the psalms to various authors writing between the 9th and 5th centuries BC. In the Quran, the Arabic word ‘Zabur’ is used for the Psalms of David in the Hebrew Bible.

Structure

Benedictions
The Book of Psalms is divided into five sections, each closing with a doxology (i.e., a benediction). These divisions were probably introduced by the final editors to imitate the five-fold division of the Torah:
 Book 1 (Psalms 1–41)
 Book 2 (Psalms 42–72)
 Book 3 (Psalms 73–89)
 Book 4 (Psalms 90–106)
 Book 5 (Psalms 107–150)

Superscriptions
Many psalms (116 of the 150) have individual superscriptions (titles), ranging from lengthy comments to a single word. Over a third appear to be musical directions, addressed to the "leader" or "choirmaster", including such statements as "with stringed instruments" and "according to lilies". Others appear to be references to types of musical composition, such as "A psalm" and "Song", or directions regarding the occasion for using the psalm ("On the dedication of the temple", "For the memorial offering", etc.). Many carry the names of individuals, the most common (73 psalms—75 if including the two Psalms attributed by the New Testament to David) being 'of David', and thirteen of these relate explicitly to incidents in the king's life. Others named include Asaph (12), the sons of Korah (11), Solomon (2), Moses (1), Ethan the Ezrahite (1), and Heman the Ezrahite (1). The Septuagint, the Peshitta (the Syriac Vulgate), and the Latin Vulgate each associate several Psalms (such as 111 and 145) with Haggai and Zechariah. The Septuagint also attributes several Psalms (like 112 and 135) to Ezekiel and Jeremiah.

Numbering

Psalms are usually identified by a sequence number, often preceded by the abbreviation "Ps." Numbering of the Psalms differs—mostly by one—between the Hebrew (Masoretic) and Greek (Septuagint) manuscripts. Protestant translations (Lutheran, Anglican, Calvinist) use the Hebrew numbering, but other Christian traditions vary:
 Catholic official liturgical texts, such as the Roman Missal, use the Greek numbering
 Modern Catholic translations often use the Hebrew numbering (noting the Greek number)
 Eastern Orthodox and Eastern Catholic translations use the Greek numbering (noting the Hebrew number)

The variance between Masorah and Septuagint texts in this numeration is likely enough due to a gradual neglect of the original poetic form of the Psalms; such neglect was occasioned by liturgical uses and carelessness of copyists. It is generally admitted that Psalms 9 and 10 (Hebrew numbering) were originally a single acrostic poem, wrongly separated by Massorah and rightly united by the Septuagint and the Vulgate. Psalms 42 and 43 (Hebrew numbering) are shown by identity of subject (yearning for the house of Yahweh), of metrical structure and of refrain (comparing Psalms 42:6, 12; 43:5, Hebrew numbering), to be three strophes of one and the same poem. The Hebrew text is correct in counting as one Psalm 146 and Psalm 147. Later liturgical usage would seem to have split up these and several other psalms. Zenner combines into what he deems were the original choral odes: Psalms 1, 2, 3, 4; 6 + 13; 9 + 10; 19, 20, 21; 56 + 57; 69 + 70; 114 + 115; 148, 149, 150. A choral ode would seem to have been the original form of Psalms 14 and 70. The two strophes and the epode are Psalm 14; the two antistrophes are Psalm 70. It is noteworthy that, on the breaking up of the original ode, each portion crept twice into the Psalter: Psalm 14 = 53, Psalm 70 = 40:14–18. Other such duplicated portions of psalms are Psalm 108:2–6 = Psalm 57:8–12; Psalm 108:7–14 = Psalm 60:7–14; Psalm 71:1–3 = Psalm 31:2–4. This loss of the original form of some of the psalms is considered by the Catholic Church's Pontifical Biblical Commission (1 May 1910) to have been due to liturgical practices, neglect by copyists, or other causes.

Verse numbers were first printed in 1509. Different traditions exist whether to include the original heading into the counting or not. This leads to inconsistent numbering in 62 psalms, with an offset of 1, sometimes even 2 verses.

Additional psalms
The Septuagint, present in Eastern Orthodox churches, includes a Psalm 151; a Hebrew version of this was found in the Psalms Scroll of the Dead Sea Scrolls. Some versions of the Peshitta (the Bible used in Syriac churches mainly in the Middle East) include Psalms 152–155. There are also the Psalms of Solomon, which are a further 18 psalms of Jewish origin, likely originally written in Hebrew, but surviving only in Greek and Syriac translation. These and other indications suggest that the current Western Christian and Jewish collection of 150 psalms were selected from a wider set.

Primary types
Hermann Gunkel's pioneering form-critical work on the psalms sought to provide a new and meaningful context in which to interpret individual psalms—not by looking at their literary context within the Psalter (which he did not see as significant), but by bringing together psalms of the same genre from throughout the Psalter. Gunkel divided the psalms into five primary types:

Hymns
Hymns are songs of praise for God's work in creation or history. They typically open with a call to praise, describe the motivation for praise, and conclude with a repetition of the call. Two sub-categories are "enthronement psalms", celebrating the enthronement of Yahweh as king, and Zion psalms, glorifying Mount Zion, God's dwelling-place in Jerusalem. Gunkel also described a special subset of "eschatological hymns" which includes themes of future restoration (Psalm 126) or of judgment (Psalm 82).

Communal laments

Communal laments are psalms in which the nation laments some communal disaster. Both communal and individual laments typically but not always include the following elements:
 address to God,
 description of suffering,
 cursing of the party responsible for suffering,
 protestation of innocence or admission of guilt,
 petition for divine assistance,
 faith in God's receipt of prayer,
 anticipation of divine response, and
 a song of thanksgiving.

In general, the individual and communal subtypes can be distinguished by the use of the singular "I" or the plural "we". However, the "I" could also be characterising an individual's personal experience that was reflective of the entire community.

Royal psalms

Royal psalms deal with such matters as the king's coronation, marriage and battles. None of them mentions any specific king by name, and their origin and use remain obscure; several psalms, especially Psalms 93–99, concern the kingship of God, and might relate to an annual ceremony in which Yahweh would be ritually reinstated as king.

Individual laments
Individual laments are psalms lamenting the fate of the psalmist. By far the most common type of psalm, they typically open with an invocation of God, followed by the lament itself and pleas for help, and often ending with an expression of confidence.

Individual thanksgiving psalms
In individual thanksgiving psalms, the opposite of individual laments, the psalmist thanks God for deliverance from personal distress.

In addition to these five major genres, Gunkel also recognised a number of minor psalm-types, including:
 communal thanksgiving psalms, in which the whole nation thanks God for deliverance;
 wisdom psalms, reflecting the Old Testament wisdom literature;
 pilgrimage psalms, sung by pilgrims on their way to Jerusalem;
 entrance and prophetic liturgies; and 
 a group of mixed psalms which could not be assigned to any category.

Composition

Origins
The composition of the psalms spans at least five centuries, from psalm 29 to others clearly from the post-Exilic period (not earlier than the fifth century BC.) The majority originated in the southern kingdom of Judah and were associated with the Temple in Jerusalem, where they probably functioned as libretto during the Temple worship. Exactly how they did this is unclear, although there are indications in some of them: "Bind the festal procession with branches, up to the horns of the altar," suggests a connection with sacrifices, and "Let my prayer be counted as incense" suggests a connection with the offering of incense.

According to Jewish tradition, the Book of Psalms was composed by the First Man (Adam), Melchizedek, Abraham, Moses, David, Solomon, Heman, Jeduthun, Asaph, and the three sons of Korah. According to Abraham ibn Ezra, the final redaction of the book was made by the Men of the Great Assembly.

Influences
Some of the psalms show influences from related earlier texts from the region; examples include various Ugaritic texts and the Babylonian Enūma Eliš. These influences may be either of background similarity or of contrast.  For example Psalm 29 seems to share characteristics with Canaanite religious poetry and themes.  Not too much should be read into this, however.  Robert Alter points out that the address to "sons of God" at the opening "are best thought of the flickering literary afterlife of a polytheistic mythology" but that "belief in them...is unlikely to have been shared by the scribal circles that produced Psalms".  The contrast against the surrounding polytheistic religion is well seen in Psalms 104:26 where their convention of a monstrous sea-god in fierce conflict, such as the Babylonian Tiamat, Canaanite Yam and the Leviathan which also appears in the Hebrew Bible, is "reduced to an aquatic pet with whom YHWH can play".

Poetic characteristics
The biblical poetry of Psalms uses parallelism as its primary poetic device. Parallelism is a kind of symmetry, in which an idea is developed by the use of restatement, synonym, amplification, grammatical repetition, or opposition. Synonymous parallelism involves two lines expressing essentially the same idea. An example of synonymous parallelism:
 "The  is my light and my salvation; whom shall I fear? The  is the stronghold of my life; of whom shall I be afraid?" (Psalm 27:1).
Two lines expressing opposites is known as antithetic parallelism. An example of antithetic parallelism:
 "And he led them in a cloud by day/ and all the night by a fiery light" (Psalm 78:14). 
Two clauses expressing the idea of amplifying the first claim is known as expansive parallelism. An example of expansive parallelism:
 "My mouth is filled with your praise/ all the day with your lauding" (Psalm 71:8).

Editorial agenda

Many scholars believe the individual Psalms were redacted into a single collection during the Second Temple period. It had long been recognized that the collection bore the imprint of an underlying message or metanarrative, but that this message remained concealed, as Augustine of Hippo said, "The sequence of the Psalms seems to me to contain the secret of a mighty mystery, but its meaning has not been revealed to me." (Enarr. on Ps. 150.1) Others pointed out the presence of concatenation, that is, adjacent Psalms sharing similar words and themes. In time, this approach developed into recognizing overarching themes shared by whole groups of psalms.

In 1985, Gerald H. Wilson's The Editing of the Hebrew Psalter proposed – by parallel with other ancient eastern hymn collections – that psalms at the beginning and end (or "seams") of the five books of Psalms have thematic significance, corresponding in particular with the placement of the royal psalms. He pointed out that there was a progression of ideas, from adversity, through the crux of the collection in the apparent failure of the covenant in Psalm 89, leading to a concert of praise at the end. He concluded that the collection was redacted to be a retrospective of the failure of the Davidic covenant, exhorting Israel to trust in God alone in a non-messianic future. Walter Brueggemann suggested that the underlying editorial purpose was oriented rather towards wisdom or sapiential concerns, addressing the issues of how to live the life of faith. Psalm 1 calls the reader to a life of obedience; Psalm 73 (Brueggemann's crux psalm) faces the crisis when divine faithfulness is in doubt; Psalm 150 represents faith's triumph, when God is praised not for his rewards, but for his being. In 1997, David. C. Mitchell's The Message of the Psalter took a quite different line. Building on the work of Wilson and others, Mitchell proposed that the Psalter embodies an eschatological timetable like that of Zechariah 9–14. This programme includes the gathering of exiled Israel by a bridegroom-king; his establishment of a kingdom; his violent death; Israel scattered in the wilderness, regathered and again imperilled, then rescued by a king from the heavens, who establishes his kingdom from Zion, brings peace and prosperity to the earth and receives the homage of the nations.

These three views—Wilson's non-messianic retrospective of the Davidic covenant, Brueggemann's sapiential instruction, and Mitchell's eschatologico-messianic programme—all have their followers, although the sapiential agenda has been somewhat eclipsed by the other two. Shortly before his untimely death in 2005, Wilson modified his position to allow for the existence of messianic prophecy within the Psalms' redactional agenda. Mitchell's position remains largely unchanged, although he now sees the issue as identifying when the historical beginning of the Psalms turns to eschatology.

The ancient music of the Psalms
The Psalms were written not merely as poems, but as songs for singing. According to Bible exegete Saadia Gaon (882–942) who served in the geonate of Babylonian Jewry, the Psalms were originally sung in the Temple precincts by the Levites, based on what was prescribed for each psalm (lineage of the singers, designated time and place, instruments used, manner of execution, etc.), but are permitted to be randomly read by anyone at any time and in any place. More than a third of the psalms are addressed to the Director of Music. Some psalms exhort the worshipper to sing (e.g. Pss. 33:1-3; 92:1-3; 96:1-3; 98:1; 101:1; 150). Some headings denote the musical instruments on which the psalm should be played (Pss. 4, 5, 6, 8, 67). Some refer to the Levites who sang one of eight melodies, one of which was known simply as "the eighth" (Hebrew: sheminit) (Pss. 6, 12). And others preserve the name for ancient eastern modes, like ayelet ha-shachar (hind of the dawn; Ps. 22); shoshanim / shushan (lilies / lily; Pss. 45; 60), said to be describing a certain melody; or ʻalmuth / ʻalamoth (mute; Pss. 9, 46), which, according to Saadia Gaon, is "a silent melody, nearly inaudible."

Despite the frequently heard view that their ancient music is lost, the means to reconstruct it are still extant. Fragments of temple psalmody are preserved in ancient synagogue and church chant, particularly in the tonus peregrinus melody to Psalm 114. Cantillation signs, to record the melody sung, were in use since ancient times; evidence of them can be found in the manuscripts of the oldest extant copies of Psalms in the Dead Sea Scrolls and are even more extensive in the Masoretic text, which dates to the Early Middle Ages and whose Tiberian scribes claimed to be basing their work on temple-period signs. (See Moshe ben Asher's 'Song of the Vine' colophon to the Codex Cairensis).

Several attempts have been made to decode the Masoretic cantillation, but the most "successful" is that of Suzanne Haïk-Vantoura (1928–2000) in the last quarter of the 20th century. Her reconstruction assumes the signs represent the degrees of various musical scales – that is, individual notes – which puts it at odds with all other existing traditions, where the signs invariably represent melodic motifs; it also takes no account of the existence of older systems of notation, such as the Babylonian and Palestinian systems. Musicologists have therefore rejected Haïk-Vantoura's theories, with her results dubious, and her methodology flawed. In spite of this, Mitchell has repeatedly defended it, showing that, when applied to the Masoretic cantillation of Psalm 114, it produces a melody recognizable as the tonus peregrinus of church and synagogue. Mitchell includes musical transcriptions of the temple psalmody of Psalms 120–134 in his commentary on the Songs of Ascents.

Regardless of academic research, Sephardic Jews have retained a tradition in the Masoretic cantillation.

Themes and execution
Most individual psalms involve the praise of God for his power and beneficence, for his creation of the world, and for his past acts of deliverance for Israel. They envision a world in which everyone and everything will praise God, and God in turn will hear their prayers and respond. Sometimes God "hides his face" and refuses to respond, questioning (for the psalmist) the relationship between God and prayer which is the underlying assumption of the Book of Psalms.

Some psalms are called "maskil" (maschil), meaning "enlightened" or "wise saying", because they impart wisdom. Most notable of these is Psalm 142 which is sometimes called the "Maskil of David"; others include Psalm 32 and Psalm 78.

A special grouping and division in the Book of Psalms are fifteen psalms (Psalms 120–134) known in the construct case, shir ha-ma'aloth ("A Song of Ascents", or "A Song of degrees"), and one as shir la-ma'aloth (Psalm 121). According to Saadia Gaon, these songs differed from the other psalms in that they were to be sung by the Levites in a "loud melody". Every psalm designated for Asaph (e.g. Psalms 50, 73–83) was sung by his descendants while making use of cymbals, in accordance with 1 Chronicles 16:5. Every psalm wherein is found the introductory phrase "Upon Mahalath" (e.g. Psalms 53 and 88) was sung by the Levites by using large percussion instruments having wide and closed bezels on both sides and beaten with two wooden sticks.

Later interpretation and influence

Overview
Individual psalms were originally hymns, to be used on various occasions and at various sacred sites; later, some were anthologised, and might have been understood within the various anthologies (e.g., ps. 123 as one of the Psalms of Ascent); finally, individual psalms might be understood within the Psalter as a whole, either narrating the life of David or providing instruction like the Torah. In later Jewish and Christian tradition, the psalms have come to be used as prayers, either individual or communal, as traditional expressions of religious feeling.

Commentaries
Many authors have commented on the psalms, including:
 Hilary of Poitiers 
 Augustine of Hippo 
 Saadia Gaon
 Thomas Aquinas 
 John Calvin
Emmanuel (pseudonym), Jewish Commentary on the Psalms.

Use in Jewish ritual
Some of the titles given to the Psalms have descriptions which suggest their use in worship:
 Some bear the Hebrew description shir. Thirteen have this description. It means the flow of speech, as it were, in a straight line or in a regular strain. This description includes secular as well as sacred song.
 Fifty-eight Psalms bear the description mizmor, a lyric ode, or a song set to music; a sacred song accompanied with a musical instrument.
 Psalm 145 alone has the designation tehillah, meaning a song of praise; a song the prominent thought of which is the praise of God.
 Thirteen psalms are described as maskil ('wise'): 32, 42, 44, 45, 52–55, 74, 78, 88, 89, and 142. Psalm 41:2, although not in the above list, has the description ashrei maskil.
 Six Psalms (16, 56–60) have the title michtam ('gold'). Rashi suggests that michtam refers to an item that a person carries with him at all times, hence, these Psalms contain concepts or ideas that are pertinent at every stage and setting throughout life, deemed vital as part of day-to-day spiritual awareness.
 Psalm 7 (along with Habakkuk chapter 3) bears the title  shigayon. There are three interpretations: (a) According to Rashi and others, this term stems from the root shegaga, meaning "mistake"—David committed some sin and is singing in the form of a prayer to redeem himself from it; (b) shigayon was a type of musical instrument;  (c) Ibn Ezra considers the word to mean "longing", as for example in the verse in Proverbs 5:19 tishge tamid.

Psalms are used throughout traditional Jewish worship. Many complete Psalms and verses from Psalms appear in the morning services (Shacharit). The pesukei dezimra component incorporates Psalms 30, 100 and 145–150. Psalm 145 (commonly referred to as "Ashrei", which is really the first word of two verses appended to the beginning of the Psalm), is read three times every day: once in shacharit as part of pesukei dezimrah, as mentioned, once, along with Psalm 20, as part of the morning's concluding prayers, and once at the start of the afternoon service. On Festival days and Sabbaths, instead of concluding the morning service, it precedes the Mussaf service. Psalms 95–99, 29, 92, and 93, along with some later readings, comprise the introduction (Kabbalat Shabbat) to the Friday night service. Traditionally, a different "Psalm for the Day"—Shir shel yom—is read after the morning service each day of the week (starting Sunday, Psalms: 24, 48, 82, 94, 81, 93, 92). This is described in the Mishnah (the initial codification of the Jewish oral tradition) in the tractate Tamid.  According to the Talmud, these daily Psalms were originally recited on that day of the week by the Levites in the Temple in Jerusalem. From Rosh Chodesh Elul until Hoshanah Rabbah, Psalm 27 is recited twice daily following the morning and evening services.  There is a Minhag (custom) to recite Psalm 30 each morning of Chanukkah after Shacharit: some recite this in place of the regular "Psalm for the Day", others recite this additionally.

When a Jew dies, a watch is kept over the body and tehillim (Psalms) are recited constantly by sun or candlelight, until the burial service. Historically, this watch would be carried out by the immediate family, usually in shifts, but in contemporary practice this service is provided by an employee of the funeral home or chevra kadisha.

Many Jews complete the Book of Psalms on a weekly or monthly basis. Each week, some also say a Psalm connected to that week's events or the Torah portion read during that week. In addition, many Jews (notably Lubavitch, and other Chasidim) read the entire Book of Psalms prior to the morning service, on the Sabbath preceding the calculated appearance of the new moon.

The reading of psalms is viewed in Jewish tradition as a vehicle for gaining God's favor. They are thus often specially recited in times of trouble, such as poverty, disease, or physical danger; in many synagogues, Psalms are recited after services for the security of the State of Israel. Sefer ha-Chinuch states that this practice is designed not to achieve favor, as such, but rather to inculcate belief in Divine Providence into one's consciousness, consistently with Maimonides' general view on Providence. (Relatedly, the Hebrew verb for prayer, hitpalal התפלל, is in fact the reflexive form of palal פלל, to intervene, petition, judge. Thus, "to pray" conveys the connotation of "judging oneself": ultimately, the purpose of prayer—tefilah תפלה—is to transform ourselves.)

In Christian prayer and worship

New Testament references show that the earliest Christians used the Psalms in worship, and the Psalms have remained an important part of worship in most Christian Churches. The Eastern Orthodox, Catholic, Presbyterian, Lutheran and Anglican Churches have always made systematic use of the Psalms, with a cycle for the recitation of all or most of them over the course of one or more weeks. In the early centuries of the Church, it was expected that any candidate for bishop would be able to recite the entire Psalter from memory, something they often learned automatically during their time as monks. Christians have used Pater Noster cords of 150 beads to pray the entire Psalter.

Paul the Apostle quotes psalms (specifically Psalms 14 and 53, which are nearly identical) as the basis for his theory of original sin, and includes the scripture in the Epistle to the Romans, chapter 3.

Several conservative Protestant denominations sing only the Psalms (some churches also sing the small number of hymns found elsewhere in the Bible) in worship, and do not accept the use of any non-Biblical hymns; examples are the Reformed Presbyterian Church of North America, the Presbyterian Reformed Church (North America) and the Free Church of Scotland (Continuing).

 Psalm 22 is of particular importance during the season of Lent as a Psalm of continued faith during severe testing.
 Psalm 23, The  is My Shepherd, offers an immediately appealing message of comfort and is widely chosen for church funeral services, either as a reading or in one of several popular hymn settings;
 Psalm 51, Have mercy on me O God, called the Miserere from the first word in its Latin version, in both Divine Liturgy and Hours, in the sacrament of repentance or confession, and in other settings;
 Psalm 82 is found in the Book of Common Prayer as a funeral recitation.
 Psalm 137, By the rivers of Babylon, there we sat down and wept, the Eastern Orthodox Church uses this hymn during the weeks preceding Great Lent.

New translations and settings of the Psalms continue to be produced. An individually printed volume of Psalms for use in Christian religious rituals is called a Psalter.

Furthermore, psalms often serve as the inspiration for much of modern or contemporary Christian worship music in a variety of styles.  Some songs are entirely based on a particular psalm or psalms, and many quote directly from the Book of Psalms (and other parts of the Bible).

Eastern Orthodox Christianity

Orthodox Christians and Greek-Catholics (Eastern Catholics who follow the Byzantine rite) have long made the Psalms an integral part of their corporate and private prayers. The official version of the Psalter used by the Orthodox Church is the Septuagint. To facilitate its reading, the 150 Psalms are divided into 20 kathismata (Greek: καθίσματα; Slavonic: каѳисмы, ; lit. "sittings") and each kathisma (Greek: κάθισμα; Slavonic: каѳисма) is further subdivided into three stases (Greek: στάσεις,  lit. "standings", sing. στάσις, stasis), so-called because the faithful stand at the end of each stasis for the Glory to the Father ....

At Vespers and Matins, different kathismata are read at different times of the liturgical year and on different days of the week, according to the Church's calendar, so that all 150 psalms (20 kathismata) are read in the course of a week. During Great Lent, the number of kathismata is increased so that the entire Psalter is read twice a week. In the twentieth century, some lay Christians have adopted a continuous reading of the Psalms on weekdays, praying the whole book in four weeks.

Aside from kathisma readings, Psalms occupy a prominent place in every other Orthodox service including the services of the Hours and the Divine Liturgy. In particular, the penitential Psalm 50 is very widely used. Fragments of Psalms and individual verses are used as Prokimena (introductions to Scriptural readings) and Stichera. The bulk of Vespers would still be composed of Psalms even if the kathisma were to be disregarded; Psalm 118, "The Psalm of the Law", is the centerpiece of Matins on Saturdays, some Sundays, and the Funeral service. The entire book of Psalms is traditionally read out loud or chanted at the side of the deceased during the time leading up to the funeral, mirroring Jewish tradition.

Oriental Christianity
Several branches of Oriental Orthodox and those Eastern Catholics who follow one of the Oriental Rites will chant the entire Psalter during the course of a day during the Daily Office. This practice continues to be a requirement of monastics in the Oriental churches.

Catholic usage

The Psalms have always been an important part of Catholic liturgy. The Liturgy of the Hours is centered on chanting or recitation of the Psalms, using fixed melodic formulas known as psalm tones. Early Catholics employed the Psalms widely in their individual prayers also; however, as knowledge of Latin (the language of the Roman Rite) became uncommon, this practice ceased among the unlearned. However, until the end of the Middle Ages, it was not unknown for the laity to join in the singing of the Little Office of Our Lady, which was a shortened version of the Liturgy of the Hours providing a fixed daily cycle of twenty-five psalms to be recited, and nine other psalms divided across Matins.

The work of Bishop Richard Challoner in providing devotional materials in English meant that many of the psalms were familiar to English-speaking Catholics from the eighteenth century onwards. Challoner translated the entirety of the Little Office into English, as well as Sunday Vespers and daily Compline. He also provided other individual Psalms such as 129/130 for prayer in his devotional books. Bishop Challoner is also noted for revising the Douay–Rheims Bible, and the translations he used in his devotional books are taken from this work.

Until the Second Vatican Council the Psalms were either recited on a one-week or, less commonly (as in the case of Ambrosian rite), two-week cycle. Different one-week schemata were employed: most secular clergy followed the Roman distribution, while regular clergy almost universally followed that of St Benedict, with only a few congregations (such as the Benedictines of St Maur) following individualistic arrangements. The Breviary introduced in 1974 distributed the psalms over a four-week cycle. Monastic usage varies widely. Some use the four-week cycle of the secular clergy, many retain a one-week cycle, either following St Benedict's scheme or another of their own devising, while others opt for some other arrangement.

Official approval was also given to other arrangements by which the complete Psalter is recited in a one-week or two-week cycle. These arrangements are used principally by Catholic contemplative religious orders, such as that of the Trappists.

The General Instruction of the Liturgy of the Hours, 122 sanctions three modes of singing/recitation for the Psalms:
 directly (all sing or recite the entire psalm);
 antiphonally (two choirs or sections of the congregation sing or recite alternate verses or strophes); and
 responsorially (the cantor or choir sings or recites the verses while the congregation sings or recites a given response after each verse).
Of these three the antiphonal mode is the most widely followed.

Over the centuries, the use of complete Psalms in the liturgy declined. After the Second Vatican Council (which also permitted the use of vernacular languages in the liturgy), longer psalm texts were reintroduced into the Mass, during the readings. The revision of the Roman Missal after the Second Vatican Council reintroduced the singing or recitation of a more substantial section of a Psalm, in some cases an entire Psalm, after the first Reading from Scripture. This Psalm, called the Responsorial Psalm, is usually sung or recited responsorially, although the General Instruction of the Roman Missal, 61 permits direct recitation.

Lutheran and Reformed usage

Following the Protestant Reformation, versified translations of many of the Psalms were set as hymns. These were particularly popular in the Calvinist tradition, where in the past they were typically sung to the exclusion of hymns (exclusive psalmody). John Calvin himself made some French translations of the Psalms for church usage, but the completed Genevan Psalter eventually used in church services consisted exclusively of translations by Clément Marot and Théodore de Bèze, on melodies by a number of composers, including Louis Bourgeois and a certain Maistre Pierre. Martin Luther's Ein feste Burg ist unser Gott is based on Psalm 46. Among famous hymn settings of the Psalter were the Scottish Psalter and the paraphrases by Isaac Watts. The first book printed in North America was a collection of Psalm settings, the Bay Psalm Book (1640).

By the 20th century, they were mostly replaced by hymns in church services. However, the Psalms are popular for private devotion among many Protestants and still used in many churches for traditional worship. There exists in some circles a custom of reading one Psalm and one chapter of Proverbs a day, corresponding to the day of the month.

Metrical Psalms are still very popular among many Reformed Churches.

Anglican usage
Anglican chant is a method of singing prose versions of the Psalms.

In the early 17th century, when the King James Bible was introduced, the metrical arrangements by Thomas Sternhold and John Hopkins were also popular and were provided with printed tunes. This version and the New Version of the Psalms of David by Tate and Brady produced in the late seventeenth century (see article on Metrical psalter) remained the normal congregational way of singing psalms in the Church of England until well into the nineteenth century.

In Great Britain, the 16th-century Coverdale psalter still lies at the heart of daily worship in Cathedrals and many parish churches. The new Common Worship service book has a companion psalter in modern English.

The version of the psalter in the American Book of Common Prayer prior to the 1979 edition is the Coverdale psalter. The Psalter in the American Book of Common Prayer of 1979 is a new translation, with some attempt to keep the rhythms of the Coverdale psalter.

Islam

According to the Islamic holy book, the Qur'an, God has sent many  messengers to mankind. Five universally acknowledged messengers  (rasul) are Abraham, Moses, David, Jesus and Muhammad, each believed to have been sent with a scripture. Muslims believe David (Dāwūd) received Psalms, or Zabur (cf. Q38:28); Jesus (Īsā) the Gospel, or Injeel; Muhammad received the Qur'an; and Abraham (Ibrahim) the Scrolls of Abraham; meanwhile, the Tawrat is the Arabic name for the Torah within its context as an Islamic holy book believed by Muslims to have been given by God to the prophets and messengers amongst the Children of Israel, and often refers to the entire Hebrew Bible. God is considered to have authored the Psalms.

Psalms in the Rastafari movement
The Psalms are one of the most popular parts of the Bible among followers of the Rastafari movement. Rasta singer Prince Far I released an atmospheric spoken version of the psalms, Psalms for I, set to a roots reggae backdrop from The Aggrovators.

Psalms set to music

Multiple psalms as a single composition
Psalms have often been set as part of a larger work. The psalms feature large in settings of Vespers, including those by Claudio Monteverdi, Antonio Vivaldi, Marc-Antoine Charpentier (84 settings H.149 - H.232) and Wolfgang Amadeus Mozart, who wrote such settings as part of their responsibilities as church musicians. Psalms are inserted in Requiem compositions, such as Psalm 126 in A German Requiem of Johannes Brahms and Psalms 130 and 23 in John Rutter's Requiem.

  (6, 32, 38, 51, 102, 130, 143) by Orlande de Lassus—1584
  by Mikołaj Gomółka—
 Psalmen Davids (1619), Symphoniae sacrae I (1629) and Becker Psalter (1661) by Heinrich Schütz
 Chandos Anthems by George Frideric Handel—1717–18
 Zwei englisch Psalmen (1842), Sieben Psalmen nach Lobwasser (1843), Elijah (1846), and Drei Psalmen (1849) by Felix Mendelssohn
 Eighteen Liturgical Psalms by Louis Lewandowski—1879
 Biblické písně by Antonín Dvořák—1894
  by Arthur Honegger—1921
 Symphony of Psalms (38, 39, 150) by Igor Stravinsky—1930
 Chichester Psalms by Leonard Bernstein—1965
 Tehillim by Steve Reich—1981
 Four Psalms (114, 126, 133, 137) by John Harbison—1998

Individual psalm settings
There are many settings of individual psalms. One of the better known examples is Gregorio Allegri's Miserere mei, a falsobordone setting of Psalm 51 ("Have mercy upon me, O God"). Settings of individual psalms by later composers are also frequent: they include works from composers such as George Frideric Handel, Felix Mendelssohn, Franz Liszt, Johannes Brahms and Ralph Vaughan Williams. Psalms also feature in more modern musical movements and popular genres.

See also

 Exclusive psalmody
 History of music in the biblical period
 Penitential Psalms
 Psalm of communal lament
 Selah
 Zabur
 Genevan Psalter
 Pesher

Notes

References

Bibliography

External links

 TehillimForAll to read Psalms (Tehillim) together with others
 Tehillim Online to read psalms of David in Hebrew or transliterated.
 Learn Tehillim Online to read and hear TEHILIM OF THE DAY in Hebrew.
 Full reading and translation of all 150 Psalms
 Psalms from Dead Sea Scrolls (Psalms 151–154)
 Book of Psalms Audiobook—King James Version
  Various versions

Translations
 Jewish translations:
 Tehillim—Psalms (Judaica Press) translation [with Rashi's commentary] at Chabad.org
 Christian translations:
 Book of Psalms—NIV
 Revised Grail Psalms (see: Grail Psalms)

Commentary and others
 Online encyclopedia
 "Psalms." Encyclopædia Britannica Online.
 Jewish
 reading of Tehillim—Psalms and many explanation.
 Psalms (Judaica Press) translation [with Rashi's commentary] at Chabad.org
 Penetrating beneath the surface level of the Tehillim—Psalms
 Reading of Tehillim—Psalms in ancient tunes and explanation. Also a free series that teaches how to read the cantilation notes of Psalms
 Christian

 
Commentary on the Psalms by Gordon Churchyard, at www.easyenglish.bible
 Introduction to the Psalms by Wilbert R. Gawrisch
 Introduction to the Psalms a Forward Movement publication
 .

|-

 
9th-century BC books
8th-century BC books
7th-century BC books
6th-century BC books
Works attributed to David
Ketuvim
Sifrei Kodesh
Anthologies
Poetic Books